The Anglican Diocese of Ijumu is one of eleven within the Anglican Province of Lokoja, itself one of 14 provinces within the Church of Nigeria. The bishop emeritus is Rt. Revd. Ezekiel Ikupolati; and the current bishop is Rt. Revd. Paul Olarewaju Ojo

Notes

Church of Nigeria dioceses
Dioceses of the Province of Lokoja